Fausto Emanuel Montero (born 22 October 1988) is an Argentine professional footballer who plays as a midfielder for Argentinos Juniors.

Career
Unión Santa Fe was Montero's first senior career club, who he began featuring for in the 2008–09 Primera B Nacional season. Aldosivi were the opponents in his debut appearance, Montero was subbed on for the final minutes of a 0–3 victory. In his fourth league match for Unión Santa Fe, Montero scored for the first time during a Primera B Nacional fixture with Deportivo Merlo. In total, he made ninety-nine appearances and scored eight goals in his first five seasons with the club. In July 2013, Montero joined Arsenal de Sarandí on loan. Twelve appearances followed in all competitions.

He returned to Unión Santa Fe for 2014 and 2015, prior to departing to sign for Primera B Nacional's Independiente Rivadavia on 1 August 2016. He was subsequently selected in thirty-four matches by managers Martín Astudillo and Alfredo Berti; the latter leading them to a fourth place finish. Argentine Primera División side Argentinos Juniors completed the signing of Montero ahead of the 2017–18 campaign. He made his Argentinos Juniors debut against River Plate on 24 September 2017, which was followed by his 200th career appearance eight months later versus Vélez Sarsfield.

Career statistics
.

Honours
Arsenal de Sarandí
Copa Argentina: 2012–13

References

External links

1988 births
Living people
People from Paraná, Entre Ríos
Argentine footballers
Association football midfielders
Primera Nacional players
Argentine Primera División players
Unión de Santa Fe footballers
Arsenal de Sarandí footballers
Independiente Rivadavia footballers
Argentinos Juniors footballers
Sportspeople from Entre Ríos Province